Shittlehope is a hamlet in County Durham, in England. It is situated on the north side of Weardale between Stanhope and Frosterley.

Shittlehope Burn, a river, runs nearby.

References

External links

Hamlets in County Durham
Stanhope, County Durham